Raising the Bar is an American reality web series which premiered March 4, 2013. The series revolves around a six teams of three people each who must create the best handmade bar which serves at least one shot of George Dickel whiskey, while at the American Royal World Series of BBQ.

References

External links
Raising the Bar

2013 American television series debuts
2013 American television series endings
2010s American reality television series
English-language television shows
Television series by Original Productions